Winningham is a surname. Notable people with the surname include:

 Geoff Winningham (born 1943), American photographer
 Herm Winningham (born 1961), American former professional baseball player
 Mare Winningham (born 1959), American actress and singer-songwriter
 Sam Winningham (born c. 1926), American football coach and player